Silno  (German Frankenhagen) is a village in the administrative district of Gmina Chojnice, within Chojnice County, Pomeranian Voivodeship, in northern Poland. It is located within the historic region of Pomerania.

The village has a population of 1,055.

Silno was a royal village of the Polish Crown, administratively located in the Tuchola County in the Pomeranian Voivodeship.

Notable people
 Renata Beger, Polish politician

References

Villages in Chojnice County